The 1998 FedEx Championship Series season, the twentieth in the CART era of U.S. open-wheel racing, consisted of 19 races, beginning in Homestead, Florida on March 15 and concluding in Fontana, California on November 1. The FedEx Championship Series Drivers' Champion was Alex Zanardi, his second consecutive championship, while the series' Rookie of the Year was Tony Kanaan. This was the first of five years of sponsorship by FDX Corporation, who became FedEx Corporation in 2000. 

The season was marred by a deadly crash on lap 175 of the U.S. 500. Adrián Fernández slammed into the outside wall in the fourth turn of Michigan International Speedway. His right front wheel was torn off and hurled over the fence into the stands, killing three spectators (Kenneth Fox, Sheryl Laster, and Michael Tautkus) and injuring six others.

Also this marks the final season with Bobby Rahal on the CART grid. Other notable events of the 1998 season include first wins for popular driver Bryan Herta and future series and Indianapolis champion Dario Franchitti. Mexican driver Adrián Fernández got his second career win at Twin Ring Motegi, the first race run there by Champ Cars.

Drivers and constructors 
The following teams and drivers competed in the 1998 CART Championship Series season.

Season Summary

Schedule

– The Nazareth race was scheduled for April 26, but postponed due to rain.
– The Houston race was scheduled for 153 miles, but was shortened due to poor visibility.
 Oval/Speedway
 Dedicated road course
 Temporary street circuit

Race results

Final driver standings

Nation's Cup 

 Top result per race counts towards Nation's Cup.

Chassis Constructor's Cup

Engine Manufacturer's Cup

Driver breakdown

References

See also
 1998 Toyota Atlantic Championship season
 1998 Indianapolis 500
 1998 Indy Racing League
 1998 Indy Lights season

Champ Car seasons
CART
 
CART